The Reverend William Stryker is a fictional character appearing in American comic books published by Marvel Comics. A minister and former sergeant with a strong hatred for mutants, he is usually depicted as an enemy of the X-Men. He is also the father of Jason Stryker.

The character has appeared in the X-Men film series, portrayed by Brian Cox in X2 (2003), Danny Huston in X-Men Origins: Wolverine (2009), and Josh Helman in X-Men: Days of Future Past (2014) and X-Men: Apocalypse (2016). In 2009, William Stryker was ranked by IGN’s as the 70th-greatest comic book villain of all time.

Publication history

Created by writer Chris Claremont and artist Brent Anderson, William Stryker first appeared in the 1982 graphic novel X-Men: God Loves, Man Kills. His character was modeled after Jerry Falwell.

Fictional character biography

God Loves, Man Kills

Reverend William Stryker is a religious fanatic with a military history. Characterized by his unequivocal hatred of mutants, Stryker's hatred goes so far as to kill his own wife Marcy Stryker and their mutant son immediately after birth in Nevada. Crazed and outraged, Stryker then makes a suicide attempt. As time passes, he is convinced that Satan has a plot to destroy humankind by corrupting prenatal souls, the result of this corruption being mutants. Additionally, Stryker eventually comes to see his mutant son's birth as a sign from God, directing him to his true calling: ensuring the eradication of all mutants.

Driven by this conviction, Stryker then becomes a popular but controversial preacher and televangelist. While his followers, including a secret paramilitary Purifiers group, commit hate crimes against mutants, Stryker arranges to have Professor Xavier kidnapped, brainwashed, and attached to a brainpower machine that will kill all living mutants. In order to stop this scheme, the X-Men are forced to join forces with Magneto. His bigotry's extent becomes obvious when he attempts to kill Kitty Pryde in front of a television audience resulting in a NYPD officer shooting him.

God Loves, Man Kills II
Stryker appeared in the X-Treme X-Men storyline (as he was assumed forgotten in-universe). This time, it was revealed that Stryker had been serving a prison sentence as a result of the events of his previous actions. Lady Deathstrike makes way onto the airplane where Stryker was being transferred. Once there, his ally kills his guards and rescues him, then it is revealed that the two are lovers, and he immediately begins a crusade against the X-Men, focusing on Wolverine, Cannonball, the X-Treme X-Men team and Shadowcat against whom he apparently keeps a grudge. Stryker sent a group of his followers against several of the X-Men, and kidnapped Pryde. Along the way, Kitty convinced Stryker that mutants were not an abomination, and he seemed to turn over a new leaf as he merged with the sentient artificial intelligence calling itself Reverend Paul and put inside a containment tube.

"Decimation"
However, Stryker returns as a major player at the start of the 2005 "Decimation" storyline, following the "House of M" storyline, in which he deemed the mutant population's sudden massive reduction in numbers as a sign of God, saying "[God] made the first step and now we have to take the next", basically rallying for genocide on TV. He was featured mostly in New X-Men as the main villain, but also appeared in other comics set during this time frame. With the Xavier Institute's student Icarus's help, he caused a bus to explode, killing about one quarter of the academy's de-powered students. Then he planned Wallflower's assassination, ordering one of his snipers to shoot Wallflower in the head. He next tried to kill Dust, though it was actually X-23. The deaths of Wallflower and Dust were Stryker's prime objectives, as he had been informed by Nimrod that both females would destroy his army. Stryker finally attacked the institute with the Purifiers, killing Quill, leaving Onyxx and Cannonball critically wounded, and hurting Bishop, Emma Frost and other students. After the Purifiers were defeated, Stryker was killed by Elixir, Wallflower's enraged boyfriend who causes catastrophic damage to Stryker's brain via a tumor's rapid growth.

Bastion resurrected Stryker with a Technarch to join Bastion's new Purifiers. Bastion revealed Stryker has the second highest number of mutant kills as the Purifiers' founder, and is surpassed only by the Sentinels' creator Bolivar Trask.

Bastion charges Stryker to locate Hope Summers and Cable, following the two's return from the future in the "Second Coming" event. His Purifiers, in conjunction with Cameron Hodge's Right footsoldiers, engage the X-Men and New Mutants. The Purifiers take out Magik with a weaponized ritual, Illyana Rasputin is abducted by demons. They also disrupt Nightcrawler's teleportation with a sonic attack, leading to disorientation. The battle culminates when Wolverine orders Archangel to take out Stryker, shifting into the Death persona and slices Stryker in half at the waist via wings.

It is later revealed that Stryker did not actually murder his son Jason Stryker, and had in fact raised the boy in secret, alleviating his son's apparently debilitating mutation with the help of A.I.M. After Stryker's death, Jason continues his father's work by joining the Purifiers.

Behind the Weapon X Project
During the "Weapons of Mutant Destruction" storyline, Stryker made his presence known (after being restored to life as a cyborg) and has formed the Weapon X Project's latest incarnation with some humans' help that he swayed to his side like Dr. Aliana Alba. He sets his sights on having his scientists work on Adamantium cyborgs to eradicate mankind. In order to refine these Adamantium cyborgs, Stryker has the Weapon X Project target Old Man Logan, Sabretooth, Warpath, Domino and Lady Deathstrike because these mutants have special abilities within Weapon X's interest. After the Adamantium cyborgs apprehend Lady Deathstrike to harvest genetic material for the Weapon X Project to use for their Adamantium Cyborgs, Old Man Logan and Sabretooth evade the Adamantium cyborgs as Stryker and the Weapon X Project were able to get their tissue samples. In addition, Stryker also has the Adamantium cyborgs target Amadeus Cho's Hulk form for a blood sample. When the Hulk and the mutants on Old Man Logan's side raid the Weapon X Project's base and frees Lady Deathstrike and Warpath, Stryker sets the base to self-destruct where its employees were killed in the process. It was also shown that Stryker was starting a project that involves the Hulk's blood that is part of ingredients for Mutant/Hulk hybrids. Following some further investigations, Old Man Logan's group and the Hulk raided the Weapon X Project's central command. The Hulk did not want Old Man Logan, Sabretooth and Lady Deathstrike to kill him. As Old Man Logan, Sabretooth, and Lady Deathstrike disputed with the Hulk, Stryker took the opportunity to get away as the group soon join the fight against Bobby Andrews's mutated H-Beta form. As the Hulk fights H-Beta and then the H-Alpha after it killed H-Beta, Stryker and Dr. Alba escaped in their helicopter upon them losing control of H-Alpha.

Reception
 In 2017, WhatCulture ranked William Stryker 5th in their "10 Most Evil X-Men Villains" list.

Other versions

Age of Apocalypse
In the alternate timeline seen in the 2005 Age of Apocalypse storyline, William Stryker was raised by a preacher father who cared for him and other children from their town after most were slaughtered by mutants. However, in a horrible stroke of irony his father was later killed by other surviving humans. As such he had to live in hiding, learning to depend on the kindness of both humans and mutants, making this version a far more tolerant person than his 616 universe counterpart. He takes the Prophet guise and begins to avenge humanity along with X-Terminated. He breaks into the apartment of Krakken, an engineer who built ovens to incinerate humans, and murders him but not his family. Before killing Krakken, Prophet reveals he previously destroyed one of Krakken's eyes and then finished the job by cutting off his head. William studies the Sentinels and mutants hunt of humans in order to refine his skills in taking them down. He says he has learned their weaknesses and despite their powers, his will and skill is more powerful. With ease, Prophet makes his way up an attacking Sentinel, cuts into its head and flips away as the robot is destroyed from the damage. He says his talents were obtained by watching the slaughter of thousands and his victories honor them. As Weapon X leads his final attack on the last surviving City of Men, Prophet allows them to escape by throwing an explosive at Weapon X. He then leads his team out of the city. Once clear the city is destroyed by Weapon X.

Ultimate Marvel
The Ultimate Marvel iteration is an Admiral named William Stryker Sr., the leader of the anti-mutant conspiracy within the U.S. Government, and also linked to the Legacy Virus's creation before presumably killing himself. Stryker's views on mutants were also passed onto his son.

The Ultimate version of William Stryker Jr. was a reverend. Living in Manhattan with his wife Kate Stryker and son John Stryker, he suffered a great tragedy when his family was killed when the "Ultimatum Wave" struck New York. William miraculously survived, but could not come to grips with his grief. He attempted to lead a spiritual congregation of survivors at a special tent set up in Central Park, but was unable to successfully conduct his service. Stryker met a group of men who knew that the mutant Magneto was responsible for the Ultimatum Wave and encouraged his rapidly-growing hatred of all mutants. They provided him with armaments and weaponry acquired from a cache of destroyed Sentinels and Stryker became the leader of an anti-mutant militia. Stryker led the Purifier forces in an attack on the Xavier Mansion during the Ultimatum Wave and emerged as the only survivor after the reformed Weapon X Team led by Rogue managed to slaughter all the Purifiers present except himself. Stryker escaped and began hallucinating visions of his deceased abusive father who egged on his hatred of mutants and religious fervor until he was ready to once again strike back against the mutants. After the reveal that mutants were the creation of human experimentation, Stryker orchestrated a massive attack in Times Square and began rounding up mutants to force them to repent under punishment of death. The X-Men appeared but were betrayed by Rogue who had made a deal with Stryker to make her normal beforehand in exchange for her services. During the struggle, the Shroud killed him by phasing an arm through his abdomen. With his last breath, he manipulated a wave of Nimrod Sentinels to kill every mutant in the country. While the numerous waves of Nimrods started hunting mutants around the whole country, others had the command to build a giant Sentinel, where Stryker's mind was transferred. With his new body, Stryker led an assault against Kitty Pryde's team of mutants before Pryde managed to damage Stryker's machine body enough to destroy him permanently.

In other media

Films

 Scottish actor Brian Cox portrayed Colonel William Stryker in the 2003 film X2. Brad Loree also briefly plays the character in flashbacks. This version is a U.S. Army Colonel with a fervent desire to harvest mutants for weapons to take down potential mutant threats, and is a military scientist who has gone into defense contracting to eradicate mutant threats. His son Jason Stryker tortured Stryker and his wife by planting telepathic illusions in their minds until Jason's mother committed suicide by drilling into her own brain after Stryker sent Jason to Professor X's school in the hopes of having his son cured, as Stryker regarded his son's mutation as a disease. Previously, Xavier's position that mutation was not a disease to be cured angered Stryker. Stryker then gave his son a lobotomy to make him more docile, and derived a substance from Jason's living body that can be used to control mutants such as his aide, Yuriko/Lady Deathstrike. After Stryker uses Nightcrawler brainwashed to make an assassination attempt on the President of the United States, the President authorizes Stryker to attack the X-Mansion. He kidnaps some of the school's students, and elsewhere kidnaps Cyclops and Professor X, whom he has Jason brainwash into using a reproduction of Cerebro to kill all mutants, though this plan is foiled when the X-Men and Magneto's mutants attack Stryker's Alkali Lake compound and rescue their kidnapped students. He attempts to have Wolverine killed by unleashing Deathstrike on him. When this fails and Wolverine confronts him, he reveals that Wolverine had actually in fact volunteered for the experiment in which Stryker bonded adamantium to his skeleton. Magneto also turned Stryker's makeshift Cerebro against him and the human race, to which Stryker is horrified. Stryker is left chained up while Magneto, Mystique and Pyro steal his helicopter. He tries to get Wolverine to rejoin him as he can reveal the man's past. After Wolverine chooses to stay with the X-Men, Stryker bellows that one day someone else will finish his work. After he leaves, the nearby dam bursts from the resulting battle and the huge wall of rushing water drowns Stryker for good. The X-Men later give the President evidence of Stryker's crimes. 
 Danny Huston portrays William Stryker in the 2009 prequel film X-Men Origins: Wolverine. The character is a Major and the leader of the Weapon X project and thus Team X. Stryker recruits James "Logan" Howlett and Victor Creed to join the Weapon X program, though Howlett eventually leaves the team. Stryker manipulates Logan into returning and undergoing the adamantium procedure under the false belief that Kayla Silverfox was murdered by Creed. After the successful adamantium bonding process, Logan learns the truth and defeats his "mutant killer" Weapon XI with aide from Creed at Stryker's Three Mile Island lab. Stryker shoots adamantium bullets in Logan's head, causing long-term amnesia, Stryker attempts to shoot Kayla but the mutant's telepathic abilities force Stryker to "walk until [his] feet bleed—and keep walking", which Stryker does. He is eventually picked up by the military police to bring him in for questioning about his connection with General Munson who tried to shut Weapon X down after learning about his son's mutant status and whom Stryker murdered.
 Don Creech portrays the character's father (credited as Agent Stryker) in the 2011 film X-Men: First Class, set in the 1960s. He appears as a CIA agent discussing the existence of mutants with Charles Xavier. Like his son, he has anti-mutant beliefs. Xavier reads his mind and mentions that he was thinking of his son to prove he was a mutant. Stryker works out a deal with the Soviet forces off Cuba's coast to join U.S. naval forces in attacking the X-Men at the film's climax, which disastrously fails due to Magneto's incredible mutant command over electromagnetism. Though Stryker's intentions are to protect the human race from mutant threats, his own actions effectively serve as part of the catalyst of Magneto's animosity towards humans and the foundation of both the X-Men and the Brotherhood of Mutants, which will eventually clash with his son more than once.
 Josh Helman portrays Major Bill Stryker in the 2014 film X-Men: Days of Future Past (while archive footage and audio of Cox is also used). As Bolivar Trask's right-hand man in 1973, Major Stryker witnesses Wolverine in action when Logan (projected back from the future), Beast, Eric Lensherr and Xavier attempt to prevent Mystique's assassination of Trask; Stryker's presence causes Wolverine's intense flashbacks of Stryker's future actions, causing a brief but crucial distraction that allows Lensherr to try to kill Mystique to change the future. Stryker is also present with Trask during the Sentinels' demonstration at Washington before Magneto launches a counterattack.
 Helman reprised his role in the 2016 film X-Men: Apocalypse. Set in 1983, it is revealed that X-Men: Days of Future Past had only altered his future's course slightly. After Xavier is used by Apocalypse to trigger the world's nuclear missiles into space, Colonel Stryker comes to the X-Mansion to investigate the events, abducting Mystique, Beast, Quicksilver and Moira MacTaggert to investigate the telepathic broadcast, unaware that his helicopter is infiltrated by Scott Summers, Jean Grey and Kurt Wagner; Kurt had teleported the three into the helicopter while Jean telepathically convinces the guards not to see the three. At some point in the past decade, Stryker was able to capture and mentally program Logan after infusing the adamantium to Logan's skeleton. When Jean is able to find and release Logan, Stryker is forced to flee his base as Logan tears through his soldiers before Jean restores a few of Logan's memories. In a deleted scene, Moira has Stryker arrested for kidnapping a federal officer and his wrongdoings on minors. Before being taken away, Stryker warns Moira about mutants being untrustworthy.

Video games
 The game-exclusive villain General William Kincaid (voiced by John DiMaggio) in X-Men Legends is largely based on the X-Men film series incarnation of William Stryker and similar human villains Bolivar Trask and Steven Lang. Under his campaign "Operation Vigilance", General Kincaid planned to use the Graviton metal to crash Asteroid M into New York in order to blame the deaths and destruction on mutants for revenge. He was later arrested after a fight in his "Master Mold Armor" hidden inside Asteroid M. 
 William Stryker is referenced several times in X-Men: The Official Game. It is revealed that Jason Stryker uses his father's secret program to kill the X-Men with HYDRA and Kenuichio Harada funding this program with him, and gave the apprentice Yuriko Oyama to him as a "gift".
 William Stryker appears in the video game adaptation of X-Men Origins: Wolverine, voiced by David Florek.
 William Stryker appears as a villain in Marvel Heroes, voiced by Jim Conner. He paid MODOK to create weapons for the Purifiers to use in their war against mutants and gave mutant genetic material to Mister Sinister to use in experiments.

References

External links
 William Stryker at Marvel.com

Characters created by Chris Claremont
Comics characters introduced in 1982
Fictional attempted suicides
Fictional aviators
Fictional Christians
Fictional clergy
Fictional colonels
Fictional cult leaders
Fictional filicides
Fictional generals
Fictional kidnappers
Fictional majors
Fictional mass murderers
Fictional murderers of children
Fictional priests and priestesses
Fictional private military members
Fictional uxoricides
Marvel Comics film characters
Marvel Comics male supervillains
Marvel Comics military personnel
Wolverine (comics) characters
X-Men supporting characters